Count Mihály Mátyás Cseszneky de Milvány et Csesznek (1910–1975) was a Hungarian industrialist and nobleman, and nominal Grand Voivode of Macedonia.

Count Mihály Cseszneky's father was an inventor and impoverished aristocrat, while his mother was the only daughter and heir of a wealthy grain merchant with extended commercial links throughout Austria-Hungary and the Balkans. After World War I, most of their properties were confiscated by the Serbian government.

In the 1930s, Count Cseszneky played an important role in the restoration of the mill industry of Hungary. In September 1943, after the forced abdication of his brother Count Gyula Cseszneky de Milvány et Csesznek, he was proclaimed Grand Voivode of Macedonia, but he did not respond to the offer. During the Nazi German occupation of Hungary he actively helped his former business partner Giorgio Perlasca to save the life of the persecuted Jews.

After World War II his properties were confiscated by the Hungarian and Yugoslav Communist regimes. As an aristocrat and prominent supporter of the Civic Democratic Party, he was labelled a class enemy and was deported to a re-education camp, along with his wife and young children. As a political prisoner, Count Mihály Cseszneky spent several years in jail and forced labour camps in Komló and Sztálinváros. He died in 1975.

Count Mihály married a Hungarian noble lady with whom he had four children, among them Count László Cseszneky de Milvány et Csesznek, whose son Count Miklós Cseszneky de Milvány et Csesznek is the current head of the family.

References 

 Kalimniou, Dean: - Alkiviadis Diammandi di Samarina (in Neos Kosmos English Edition, Melbourne, 2006)
 Rallo, Michele: I "Regni-meteora" nell’Europa Orientale durante le guerre mondiali ("Storia del Novecento", anno V, n. 89, settembre 2008)

External links 
 Pequeños países olvidados de la Segunda Guerra Mundial
 Hungarian aristocracy
 ΠΡΙΓΚΗΠΑΤΟ ΠΙΝΔΟΥ ΚΑΙ ΜΑΚΕΔΟΝΙΑΣ 1941-1944
 Cseszneky de Milvány et Csesznek family
 Gróf Milványi Cseszneky Gyula és Mihály Emlékbizottság
 CSESZNEKY de MILVÁNY et CSESZNEK

1910 births
1975 deaths
 Mihaly Cseszneky de Milvány et Csesznek
Counts of Hungary
Hungarian people of World War II
20th-century Hungarian businesspeople
Hungarian people of Croatian descent
Hungarian people of German descent
Hungarian people of Swiss descent